During the 1961–62 English football season, Brentford competed in the Football League Third Division. Financial cutbacks and a reduction in size of the playing squad led to Brentford's relegation to the Fourth Division for the first time in the club's history.

Season summary

Off-season 
After a number of seasons in which Brentford challenged and failed to win promotion from the Third Division with a wafer-thin squad, low attendances and a debt of over £50,000 meant that the 1961 off-season would be a period of turmoil. A threat of a players' strike in support of the removal of the maximum wage during the second half of the previous season was averted and it was revealed that the club had turned down £12,000 and £9,000 bids respectively for prolific strike partners Jim Towers and George Francis during the 1959–60 season – a period when the club was still confident of promotion from the Third Division. With those expectations dampened by mediocre performances in the 1960–61 season, up-and-coming outside left John Docherty was sold for £17,000 during the final months of the campaign. Towers and particularly Francis performed poorly by their standards during the 1960–61 season and consequently bids of a similar amount to that of the previous year failed to materialise.

Future Nottingham Central MP Jack Dunnett joined the board in July 1961 and took over as chairman from Frank Davis three months later. For the first time since relegation to the Third Division South in 1953, Brentford conducted an end-of-season clearout in a bid to reduce the squad size and wage bill. Ken Horne, Billy Goundry, George Bristow, Dennis Heath and Eric Parsons, who had each made over 100 appearances for the club, were released, as were five other bit-part players. Most galling for the Brentford supporters was the sale of forwards Jim Towers and George Francis (who had accounted for 299 goals between them since 1954) to divisional and local rivals Queens Park Rangers for a combined £8,000 fee. £6,000 Cardiff City forward Brian Edgley was signed as a replacement and Ray Reeves and Jimmy Belcher were brought in to strengthen the back lines. The signings took the squad size to just 16 players, six of whom held a part-time status (Cakebread, Dargie, Gelson, Gitsham, Reeves and Ryecraft) and of those, two (Gelson and Ryecraft) were juniors who had yet to make their senior debuts. In addition, assistant trainer Jack Holliday (the club's record goalscorer) was sacked and trainer Fred Monk resigned in April 1962.

Season 
Brentford had a dreadful start to the 1961–62 season, losing 8 of the first 9 matches in all competitions. The signing of £6,000 former England international forward Johnny Brooks in early September 1961 helped boost the team's morale enough for them to register their first point of the season on 9 September 1961, courtesy of a goalless draw with Southend United at Griffin Park. After another loss and the Bees' first two victories of the season, three successive defeats led manager Malky MacDonald to re-sign forward George Francis from Queens Park Rangers on 6 October. Francis' return helped inspire a victory over Swindon Town 24 hours later, courtesy of a Johnny Rainford goal. The FA Cup provided a welcome distraction from the league, in which Brentford were firmly rooted in the relegation zone. The Bees advanced to the third round of the FA Cup, taking high-flying Second Division club Leyton Orient to a replay before being knocked out. After the defeat, the board again reached for the chequebook and signed outside forward Micky Block from Chelsea for a £5,000 fee.

Poor form in the opening months of 1962 failed to avert the relegation threat and a bid to buy back Jim Towers from Queens Park Rangers failed, but a run of three wins and one draw in late March and early April lifted Brentford to 21st, the club's highest position of the season so far. Of the following four matches, a victory, a draw and two defeats left the Bees' in 23rd place, with their destiny out of their own hands. Victory for 21st-place Barnsley over 20th-place Torquay United on 2 May ended the Bees' hopes of survival. Brentford's 9-year stay in the Third Division officially ended the following day after a 2–0 defeat to Hull City at Boothferry Park. The relegation completed a drop from the First Division in 1947 to the Fourth Division in 1962, a 15-year fall from grace.

League table

Results
Brentford's goal tally listed first.

Legend

Football League Third Division

FA Cup

Football League Cup 

 Sources: 100 Years Of Brentford, Statto

Playing squad 
Players' ages are as of the opening day of the 1961–62 season.

 Sources: 100 Years Of Brentford, Timeless Bees

Coaching staff

Statistics

Appearances and goals

Players listed in italics left the club mid-season.
Source: 100 Years Of Brentford

Goalscorers 

Players listed in italics left the club mid-season.
Source: 100 Years Of Brentford

Management

Summary

Transfers & loans

Awards 
 Supporters' Player of the Year: Ken Coote

References 

Brentford F.C. seasons
Brentford